Kollam Parappu widely known as Quilon Bank is one of the most productive fishing grounds on the south-west coast of India. The bank has been defined as that part of the sea bed between 08 'N and 09 'N latitude in the depth range of 275–375 meters. It covers an area of 3,300 km2 off the coast of Kollam and Alappuzha districts. The region is a fertile fishing ground with rich marine biological diversity, including deep sea prawns, shrimps and lobsters. The temperature of the Quilon Bank waters is mild (between 21 and 26 degrees Celsius), and the salinity ranges between 34 and 34.6 parts per thousand.

The peak season for this fishing ground is from July to October. The fish fauna of the Quilon Bank has a dominant population of Nemipterids and is also demarcated as the most important ground for pandalid shrimp. The bank attracts many fisheries scientists for conducting scientific research, oceanographic studies, ecological studies, etc.

References

Fishing areas of the Indian Ocean
Kollam